Kleis is a surname. Notable people with the surname include:

 (born 1956), Danish politician
Dave Kleis (born 1964), American politician
Martin Kleis (1850–1908), Danish trader on Nui
, winner of the 2010 Copenhagen Marathon

See also
Kleis Site
Klaus